Flying Tiger Development, also known as Flying Tiger Entertainment, Flying Tiger Mobile, and FTEGames is an American Developer, publisher, and distributor or video games headquartered in Fullerton, California, US. Founded and incorporated on June 9, 1998 by Johnny Brandstetter, also known as Johnny Turbo from the Turbo Grafx.

Flying Tiger Development is currently developing and publishing games under Flying Tiger Entertainment, and FTEGames.

Flying Tiger also did several interactive DVD gold release menus and mini-games with VIZ EFX a wholly owned subsidiary of FTE,  for Disney in 2000 - 2004; Sleeping Beauty, The Black Cauldron, The Wind in the Willows, Cinderella, and Dumbo while at their old office on Universal Lot.

Relationship with Hudson 

John Brandstetter, aka Johnny Turbo[1] CEO of Flying Tiger Entertainment [2]was the original brand manager of the TurboGrafx16[3] and Turbo Duo[4] back when the console launched in the United States in 1989. He was the character they created for the launch of the brand and was featured in many advertisements.

Flying Tiger worked with Hudson Soft Japan directly in 2001, when they entered a joint venture agreement to bring Hudson games to the US mobile market and revive the struggling brand.

During this time, they also established their relationships with Verizon, AT&T, Sprint, T-Mobile, Cricket, Nextel, Tracphone, IUSACELL, EEGASO, Pelephone, O2, Vodafone, Softbank, Virgin, and many other carriers worldwide.

Hudson Soft was run out of Flying Tigers office from 2003 - 2005. bringing success back to Hudson Soft, so in 2006 they parted ways and Hudson opened an office in San Mateo.

The Flying Tiger and Hudson Soft joint venture started with 25 titles, as noted in their Press Release[5] some of the titles published were, Ys Book 1 & 2: The Vanished Omens,  Military Madness, Bomberman, Nuts and Milk, Adventure Island, Bomberland: Battles, Bomberman Special, Lode Runner, Lode Runner 2, Star Soldier, BurgerTime, BurgerTime 2, Nutty's Tale, Tennis Challenge, Planet Bowling, Blazing Lazers, Star Soldier, All-Star Baseball, Cannon Ball, Klondike Solitaire, Mouse Track, Nikkis Cubie, Pinball, Powerful vBall girls, Super Darts, World Cycling, Blue Flame, Putter Golf, Pyramid Crash, Radar Fleet, Space Blast, Hamster Paradise, Goblin's Lair, Horse Race, Beach Volleyball, Free Cell, Power Billiards, The Source Music Hip Hop. and Combat Chess.

Flying Tiger produced and created well known titles over the years including several engines that are still in use today;

Game development

PC 
 Kerbal Space Program- (Co-development with Squad for Turbo Charged Edition)
 Real Heroes: Firefighter - (Co-developed with Open-2)

Xbox One 
 Kerbal Space Program (Created all original console functionality with Squad)

PlayStation 4 
 Kerbal Space Program (Squad)

PlayStation 2 

 Growlanser Generations (Working Designs)
 Unison: Rebels of Rhythm and Dance (Tecmo)Hudson Soft (Flying Tiger did motion capture)

PC 

 Heavy Gear 2 (Activision)
 Interstate '82 (Activision)
 King of the Hill Block Party (Fox Interactive)

PlayStation  

 Time Crisis: Project Titan (Namco)
 Sports Car GT (EA)
 Command & Conquer: Renegade (Westwood)
 Digimon World (Bandai)

Arcade  

 Marlboro Racing (Media Partners 2003)

Xbox Arcade  

 Arcade Super Track Racing (Media Partners)

Game Boy Advance  

 The Three Stooges (Komar)
 M&M’s Party (Majesco)
 Ultimate Book of Spells (TDK Mediaactive)
 No Rules: Get Phat (TDK)

Zeebo 
 Toy Raid 2010 (Zeebo)
 Shootin' Gallery

Brew 
 Air Raid (FTE)
 Air Raid 2 (FTE)
 Air Raid Plus (FTE)
 Toy Raid Strikers (FTE)
 Toy Raid Elite Forces (FTE/Google)
 Shootin’ Gallery (FTE)
 Shootin’ Gallery 2 (FTE)
 Mobislide (FTE)
 Aurora Base (FTE)
 Ball Frenzy (FTE)
 Ball Buster (FTE)
 Loteria (FTE)
 Rascal Roundup (FTE)
 Hook-Ups Wallpapers (FTE/Hook-Ups)
 Zoo-Cube (FTE/Nalin)
 The Three Stooges

Flying Tiger -  Disney Relationship 
 Pirates of the Caribbean (FTE/Disney)
 Pirates of the Caribbean 2 (FTE/ Disney)
 National Treasures (FTE/Disney)
 The Incredibles (FTE/ Disney)

Flying Tiger -  Hudson Relationship 
 Military Madness (FTE/Hudson)
 Bomberman ( FTE/Hudson)
 Nutty’s Tale (FTE/Hudson)
 Lode Runner (FTE/Hudson)
 Lode Runner 2 (FTE/Hudson)
 Burger Time (FTE/Hudson)
 Y’s Book 1 (FTE/Hudson)
 Ys Book 2 (FTE/Hudson)
 Star Soldier (FTE/Hudson)
 Planet Bowling (FTE/Hudson)
 Bomberman Special (FTE/Hudson)
 All-Star Baseball (FTE-Hudson)
 Tennis Challenge (FTE/Hudson)
 World Cycling (FTE/Hudson)
 Putter Golf (FTE/Hudson)
 FreeCell (FTE/Hudson)
 Pyramid Crash (FTE/Hudson)
 Nikki’s Cubie (FTE/Hudson)
 Radar Fleet (FTE/Hudson)
 Adventure Island (FTE/Hudson)
 Power Billiards (FTE/Hudson)
 V-Power VolleyBall (FTE/Hudson)
 Cannon Ball (FTE/Hudson)
 The Source Music Hip Hop (FTE/Hudson)
 Nice Darts (FTE/Hudson)
 All-Star Baseball (FTE/Hudson)
 Barbarian's Quest (FTE/ Hudson)

References

Video game publishers
Video game companies established in 1998
Video game companies of the United States